Fort Winnebago was a 19th-century fortification of the United States Army located on a hill overlooking the eastern end of the portage between the Fox and Wisconsin Rivers east of present-day Portage, Wisconsin. It was the middle one of three fortifications along the Fox-Wisconsin Waterway that also included Fort Howard in Green Bay, Wisconsin and Fort Crawford in Prairie du Chien, Wisconsin. Fort Winnebago was constructed in 1828 as part of an effort to maintain peace between white settlers and the region's Native American tribes following the Winnebago War of 1827. The fort's location was chosen not only because of its proximity to the site of Red Bird's surrender in the Winnebago War, but also because of the strategic importance of the portage on the Fox-Wisconsin Waterway, a heavily traveled connection between the Great Lakes and the Mississippi River. Fort Winnebago's location near the portage allowed it to regulate transportation between the lakes and the Mississippi.

With the exception of the participation of troops from the fort in the 1832 Black Hawk War, Fort Winnebago was not involved in any combat operations during its occupation by the U.S. Army. Instead, the garrison, which from 1829 to 1831 included Lt. Jefferson Davis (later President of the Confederate States of America), was put to work in building a military road between Portage and Fond du Lac, Wisconsin, and assisting with the relocation of the Ho-Chunk Nation from Wisconsin to Minnesota during the 1840s. In 1845, the absence of any real threat to peace in the region prompted the abandonment of the fort. Nine years later the site was sold into private hands, and in 1856 a fire destroyed much of the fort.

Fort Winnebago Surgeons Quarters

Today, all that remain intact are the fort's surgeon's and officers' quarters. This structure now operates as the Fort Winnebago Surgeon's Quarters, a historic house museum operated by the Wisconsin Society Daughters of the American Revolution, and is listed on the National Register of Historic Places.

The museum's grounds also include Garrison School, a one-room schoolhouse used from 1850-1960 and furnished to appear as in the 1850s.

Indian Agency House

The Fort Winnebago Old Indian Agency House, is the only known Indian Agency still located on its original location. Known as the Historic Indian Agency House, it is also an original structure associated with the fort. It was erected in 1832 by the U.S. Government as a residence and office for Indian sub-Agent John Kinzie, who served as a liaison between the local Ho Chunk (also known as Winnebago) Nation and the U.S. Government.  It has been operated as a museum since 1932 by The National Society of the Colonial Dames of America in the State of Wisconsin. The Historic Indian Agency House is listed as nationally significant on the Register of Historic Places and is open to the public for visitation May 15 through October 15 each year.

References

External links
Fort Winnebago Historical Site
Fort Winnebago Surgeons' Quarters - Wisconsin Society Daughters of the American Revolution
Historic Indian Agency House

Historic American Landscapes Survey in Wisconsin
Winnebago
Museums in Columbia County, Wisconsin
Pre-statehood history of Wisconsin
Historic house museums in Wisconsin
Military and war museums in Wisconsin
Medical museums in the United States
Education museums in the United States
Portage, Wisconsin
Winnebago
National Register of Historic Places in Columbia County, Wisconsin
1828 establishments in Michigan Territory
Fox–Wisconsin Waterway
Black Hawk War forts